
Gmina Gowarczów is a rural gmina (administrative district) in Końskie County, Świętokrzyskie Voivodeship, in south-central Poland.

Villages
Gmina Gowarczów contains the villages and settlements of Bębnów, Bernów, Borowiec, Brzeźnica, Giełzów, Gowarczów, Kamienna Wola, Komaszyce, Korytków, Kupimierz, Kurzacze, Miłaków, Morzywół, Rogówek, Ruda Białaczowska and Skrzyszów.

Neighbouring gminas
Gmina Gowarczów is bordered by the gminas of Białaczów, Gielniów, Końskie, Opoczno and Przysucha.

References
Polish official population figures 2006

Gowarczow
Końskie County